The Leeds Development Corporation was established in 1988 to develop South Central Leeds and the Kirkstall Valley. Its flagship developments included the Royal Armouries Museum at Clarence Dock and the Hunslet Green housing development. During its lifetime 4.1 million sq.ft. of non-housing development and 571 housing units were built. Around 9,066 new jobs were created and some £357m of private finance was leveraged in.

The Chairman was Peter Hartley CBE and the Chief Executive was Martin Eagland. The Executive Directors were Alan Goodrum, Robin Herzberg and Stuart Kenny. It was dissolved in 1995.

References

Defunct companies based in Leeds
Business services companies established in 1988
Companies disestablished in 1995
Organisations based in Leeds
Defunct public bodies of the United Kingdom
Development Corporations of the United Kingdom